Ballyforan is a village in south County Roscommon, Ireland on the R363 road between Ballygar and Dysart.  It lies beside the River Suck which separates County Roscommon and County Galway.

Amenities
Amenities in the area include a post office, pub, grocery shop, school, health centre, GAA and snooker clubs, community centre, school and pre-school, and the Roman Catholic Church of St. Josephs (built in 1857). As of early 2020, the local national (primary) school, Ballyforan Mixed National School, had approximately 60 pupils enrolled.

Notable people
Politician and sportsperson Jack McQuillan was born in Ballyforan. He won the All-Ireland Senior Football Championship twice, and represented Roscommon in Dáil Éireann from 1948 to 1965.

See also
 List of towns and villages in Ireland

References

Towns and villages in County Roscommon